Las Toninas is a town in La Costa Partido of the Province of Buenos Aires, Argentina.

Overview
Founded in 1960, Las Toninas was christened in honor of the Commerson's dolphin (known locally as a tonina). The shore had been the site of a shipwreck in 1883 of a commercial vessel registered in the British Empire, whose captain settled nearby and established the Estancia Los Ingleses.

The shore at Las Toninas is distinguishable from its sister communities' by the extensive growth of  tamarix bushes. These were used to create a hedge maze as a tourist attraction, and the 6,400 m² (16,000 ft²) maze is touted locally as the nation's largest.

Las Toninas is also known as the "Fiber Optical Capital" in Argentina; because it is the single point where submarine optical fiber networks reach Argentina via several landing cable stations, by companies such as Level 3 (with its SAC ring), TIWS (Atlantis 2), Telecom-Antel (Bicentenario cable system), and Telefónica (SAM 1). The town was chosen because its coastline was not as rocky as others in the region.

Notes and references

Populated places in Buenos Aires Province
Populated coastal places in Argentina
Populated places established in 1960
Seaside resorts in Argentina